The Sentencing Council for England and Wales is a non-departmental public body that is responsible for developing sentencing guidelines, monitoring the use of guidelines and assessing and reviewing a wide range of decisions relating to sentencing. It was established in April 2010 in consequence of the Coroners and Justice Act 2009, replacing the Sentencing Guidelines Council and the Sentencing Advisory Panel, its predecessor bodies.

The Council aims to ensure a consistent approach to sentencing, demystify court processes and sentencing for victims and the public, and increase confidence in the criminal justice system.

The Act gives the Sentencing Council a statutory duty to prepare sentencing guidelines about the discharge of a court's duty under section 144 of the Criminal Justice Act 2003 (c. 44) (reduction in sentences for guilty pleas), and sentencing guidelines about the application of any rule of law as to the totality of sentences. It is able to prepare sentencing guidelines about any other matter.

It is also required to consider the impact of sentencing practice and the Government may ask it to look at the impact of policy and legislative proposals relating to sentencing.

The Council comprises eight members of the judiciary and six non-judicial members, all with expertise in the criminal justice system. The Council’s chairman is Lord Justice William Davis, a Court of Appeal judge.

All members of the Council were appointed by the Lord Chancellor and the Lord Chief Justice.

External links
Official website
Coroners and Justice Act 2009

Legal organisations based in England and Wales
English law
Non-departmental public bodies of the United Kingdom government
2010 establishments in the United Kingdom